General elections were held in Grenada on 27 November 2003. The New National Party government of Prime Minister Keith Mitchell won a third consecutive term with a reduced majority. Voter turnout was 57.7%.

Results

References

Elections in Grenada
Grenada
General election
November 2003 events in North America